The 1933–34 season was Newport County's second consecutive season in the Third Division South and their 13th in the Football League.

Season review

Results summary

Results by round

Fixtures and results

Third Division South

FA Cup

Third Division South Cup

Welsh Cup

League table

External links
 Newport County 1933-1934 : Results
 Newport County football club match record: 1934
 Welsh Cup 1933/34

References

 Amber in the Blood: A History of Newport County. 

1933-34
English football clubs 1933–34 season
1933–34 in Welsh football